Hexaplex is a genus of medium-sized to large sea snails, marine gastropod mollusks in the subfamily muracinae of the family Muricidae, the murex shells or rock snails.

This genus is known in the fossil record from the Paleocene to the Quaternary period (age range: from 61.7 to 0.012 million years ago.). Fossil shells within this genus have been found all over the world.

Description
This genus includes shells in the family Muricidae that are solid and globose. They contain five to eight varices that are more or less foliaceous.

Species
Species within the genus Hexaplex include :

 Hexaplex angularis (Lamarck, 1822)
 †Hexaplex arietinus (Millet, 1865) 
 Hexaplex bifasciatus (A. Adams, 1853)
 † Hexaplex bourgeoisi (Tournouër, 1875) 
 Hexaplex brassica (Lamarck, 1822)
 Hexaplex cichoreum (Gmelin, 1791)
 Hexaplex conatus (McMichael, 1964)
 Hexaplex duplex Röding, 1798
 Hexaplex erythrostomus (Swainson, 1831)
 Hexaplex fulvescens (Sowerby II, 1834)
 Hexaplex kuesterianus (Tapparone-Canefri, 1875)
 † Hexaplex ledoni Ceulemans, van Dingenen, Merle & Landau, 2016 
 Hexaplex megacerus (G.B. Sowerby II, 1834)
 Hexaplex pecchiolianus (d'Ancona, 1871)
 Hexaplex princeps (Broderip, 1833)
 Hexaplex regius (Swainson, 1821)
 Hexaplex rileyi D'Attilio & Myers, 1984
 Hexaplex rosarium (Röding, 1798)
 Hexaplex saharicus (Locard, 1897)
 Hexaplex stainforthi (Reeve, 1843)
 † Hexaplex tapparonii (Bellardi, 1873) 
 † Hexaplex tridentatus (Tate, 1888) 
 Hexaplex trunculus (Linnaeus, 1758)
 † Hexaplex turonensis (Dujardin, 1837) 

 Species brought into synonymy
 Hexaplex ambiguus (Reeve, 1845): synonym of Muricanthus ambiguus (Reeve, 1845)
 Hexaplex anatomica Perry, 1811: synonym of Homalocantha anatomica (Perry, 1811) (original combination)
 Hexaplex bojadorensis (Locard, 1897): synonym of Favartia bojadorensis (Locard, 1897)
 Hexaplex bozzadamii (Franchi, 1990): synonym of Hexaplex kusterianus bozzadamii (Franchi, 1990),: synonym of Hexaplex kuesterianus bozzadamii (Franchi, 1990)
 Hexaplex foliacea Perry, 1811: synonym of Hexaplex cichoreum (Gmelin, 1791) (synonym)
 Hexaplex fusca Perry, 1811: synonym of Homalocantha scorpio (Linnaeus, 1758) (synonym)
 Hexaplex kusterianus: synonym of Hexaplex kuesterianus (Tapparone Canefri, 1875) (misspelling)
 Hexaplex nigritus (Philippi, 1845): synonym of Muricanthus nigritus (Philippi, 1845)
 Hexaplex punctuata Perry, 1811: synonym of Hexaplex fulvescens (G. B. Sowerby II, 1834) (nomen oblitum)
  Hexaplex puniceus W. R. B. Oliver, 1915: synonym of Favartia garrettii (Pease, 1868)
 Hexaplex radix (Gmelin, 1791): synonym of Muricanthus radix (Gmelin, 1791)
 Hexaplex ryalli Houart, 1993: synonym of Hexaplex saharicus ryalli Houart, 1993 (original combination)
 Hexaplex strausi (A.H. Verrill, 1950): synonym of Muricanthus strausi (A. H. Verrill, 1950)
 Hexaplex tenuis Perry, 1811: synonym of Homalocantha scorpio (Linnaeus, 1758) (synonym)
 Hexaplex turbinatus : synonym of Hexaplex duplex (Röding, 1798)
 Hexaplex varius (Sowerby II, 1834): synonym of Chicoreus varius (G. B. Sowerby II, 1834)

Extinct species
Extinct species within the genus Hexaplex include:

 †Hexaplex (Hexaplex) colei   Palmer 1937
 †Hexaplex (Hexaplex) engonatus   Conrad 1833
 †Hexaplex (Hexaplex) etheringtoni   Vokes 1968
 †Hexaplex (Hexaplex) katherinae   Vokes 1968
 †Hexaplex (Hexaplex) marksi   Harris 1894
 †Hexaplex (Hexaplex) silvaticus   Palmer 1937
 †Hexaplex (Hexaplex) supernus   Palmer 1947
 †Hexaplex (Hexaplex) texanus   Vokes 1968
 †Hexaplex (Hexaplex) vanuxemi   Conrad 1865
 †Hexaplex (Hexaplex) veatchi   Maury 1910
 †Hexaplex (Trunculariopsis) bourgeoisi   Tournouër 1875
 †Hexaplex (Trunculariopsis) brevicanthos   Sismonda 1847
 †Hexaplex (Trunculariopsis) campanii   De Stefani and Pantanelli 1878
 †Hexaplex (Trunculariopsis) rudis   Borson 1821
 †Hexaplex hertweckorum   Petuch 1988

References

Further reading
 Radwin G. E. & D'Attilio A. (1986) Murex shells of the world. An illustrated guide to the Muricidae. Stanford Univ. Press, Stanford, x + pp. 1–284 incl 192 figs. + 32 pls.
 Gofas, S.; Le Renard, J.; Bouchet, P. (2001). Mollusca, in: Costello, M.J. et al. (Ed.) (2001). European register of marine species: a check-list of the marine species in Europe and a bibliography of guides to their identification. Collection Patrimoines Naturels, 50: pp. 180–213
 Merle D., Garrigues B. & Pointier J.-P. (2011) Fossil and Recent Muricidae of the world. Part Muricinae. Hackenheim: Conchbooks. 648 pp.

 
Muricinae
Extant Selandian first appearances